The Rectors of the College of Europe:

Hendrik Brugmans (1950–1972)
Jerzy Łukaszewski (1972–1990)
Werner Ungerer (1990–1993)
Gabriel Fragnière (1993–1995)
Otto von der Gablentz (1996–2001)
Piet Akkermans (2001–2002)
Robert Picht (Rector ad interim) (2002 – 31 January 2003)
Paul Demaret (2003–2013)
Jörg Monar (2013–2020)
Federica Mogherini (2020-)

A second campus was opened at the invitation of the Polish government in Natolin (Warsaw) in 1992. Vice-rectors of the College of Europe's Natolin (Warsaw) campus:
Ettore Deodato (1993)
David W. Lewis (1994–1996)
Jacek Saryusz-Wolski (1996–1999)
Piotr Nowina-Konopka (1999–2004)
Robert Picht (Vice-Rector ad interim) (2004–2005)
Robert Picht (2005–2007)
Ewa Ośniecka-Tamecka (2007–)

College of Europe
College of Europe Rectors